Gérard Lorgeoux (born August 21, 1943 in Plumelin) was a member of the National Assembly of France.  He represented  Morbihan's 3rd constituency from 2002 to 2012
 as a member of the Union for a Popular Movement.

References

1943 births
Living people
People from Morbihan
Politicians from Brittany
Union for a Popular Movement politicians
Deputies of the 12th National Assembly of the French Fifth Republic
Deputies of the 13th National Assembly of the French Fifth Republic